James Naper Dutton, 1st Baron Sherborne (22 October 1744 – 22 May 1820), was a British peer.

Background
Sherborne was the son of James Lenox Dutton (originally James Lenox Naper), of Sherborne, Gloucestershire, by his second wife Jane, daughter of Christopher Bond. He was educated at Eton College (1755–1762) and Christ Church, Oxford (1763).

Political career
He was appointed High Sheriff of Gloucestershire for 1779–80 and was elected Member of Parliament for Gloucestershire in 1780, a seat he held until 1784. The latter year he was raised to the peerage as Lord Sherborne, Baron of Sherborne, in the County of Gloucester.

Investments
In 1809 he became the major investor of the Gloucester and Cheltenham Railway Company, subscribing £10,000 of the £26,000 capital.

Family
Lord Sherborne married Elizabeth, daughter of Wenman Coke and sister of the future Earl of Leicester, in 1774. They had four children:

Elizabeth Jane Dutton (1775–1836), married Thomas Howard, 16th Earl of Suffolk.
Anne Margaret Dutton (1776–1852)
Frances Mary Dutton (1778–1807), married Prince Ivan Ivanovitch Bariatinski of Russia (1772–1825)., Russian Minister to the Court of Bavaria.
John Dutton, 2nd Baron Sherborne (1779–1862), married Mary Bilson Legge (1780–1864), daughter of Henry Bilson Legge, 2nd Baron Stawell (1757–1820).

Lord Sherborne died in May 1820, aged 75, and was succeeded in the barony by his son, John. Lady Sherborne died in December 1824.

Obituary
His obituary, from the July - December 1820 New Monthly Magazine and Universal Register states:

References

1744 births
1820 deaths
People educated at Eton College
Alumni of Christ Church, Oxford
Peers of Great Britain created by George III
Members of the Parliament of Great Britain for English constituencies
British MPs 1780–1784
High Sheriffs of Gloucestershire
James 1